The Black Week was a crisis in Honolulu, Hawaii  that nearly caused a war between the Provisional Government there and United States.

Background 
President Grover Cleveland of the United States denounced the Overthrow of the Hawaiian Kingdom. Cleveland vowed to reverse the damage done and restore the Kingdom. Following the Overthrow, Cleveland launched an investigation headed by James Blount as United States Minister to Hawaii, known as the Blount Report. After the investigation, Blount was replaced by Albert Willis, who began negotiations between ex-queen Liliuokalani for a US led invasion to restore the monarchy. However, the agreements collapsed.

Crisis 

On December 14, 1893, Albert Willis arrived in Honolulu aboard the USRC Corwin unannounced, bringing an anticipation of an American invasion to restore the monarchy. With the hysteria of a military assault, he stimulated fears by staging a mock invasion with the USS Adams and USS Philadelphia, directing their guns toward the capital. Willis' goal was to maintain fear of the United States to pressure the Provisional Government into forfeiting the island back to the queen or at least to maintain a US invasion as a possible reality, carrying out this to the limit of the Navy remaining officially neutral. He stated there were more than 1,000 men of military age in the city the Provisional Government was arming. Willis ordered Rear Admiral John Irwin to organize a landing operation using troops on the two American ships. He made no attempt to conceal preparations of the operation, as men readied equipment on deck. The next shipment of mail, news, and information was yet to arrive aboard the Alameda, so until then the public was uninformed of the relations between Hawaii and the U.S. Sanford B. Dole, President of Hawaii attempted to quell the anxiety by assuring the public there would be no invasion. On January 3, 1894 public anxiety became critical which gave the incident its name, the “Black Week”. As the anticipation of a conflict intensified in Honolulu Irwin became concerned for American citizens and property in the city, considering he may actually have to land troops to protect them if violence erupted in retaliation for the crisis. On January 11, 1894, Willis revealed to Dole the invasion to be a hoax.

Aftermath 
Though Willis did not restore the monarchy, he was able to incite doubt in the Hawaiian public over the Provisional Government and communicate that the US was capable of going to war with them. This was one of the factors resulting in the formation of a republic. To Cleveland this was an improvement; avoiding annexation left the potential to restore the monarchy and was more favorable in keeping Hawaii an independent country than as a territory of the United States. Shortly afterward, on 4 July 1894, the Provisional Government renamed itself by declaring the Republic of Hawaii.

References 

Conflicts in 1893
Conflicts in 1894
Overthrow of the Hawaiian Kingdom
Riots and civil disorder in Hawaii
1893 in Hawaii
1894 in Hawaii